Iftikhar (also spelt Iftekhar) is a masculine given name. People named Iftikhar or Iftekhar include:

 Iftikhar Ahmed (Kalat cricketer), Pakistani cricketer who played for Kalat in the 1960s
 Iftikhar Ahmed (cricketer, born 1990), Pakistani cricketer
 Iftikhar Ahmad (journalist), Pakistani research journalist
 Iftikhar Arif, Pakistani poet
 Iftikhar A. Ayaz, Tuvaluan diplomat
 Iftikhar Khan, Pakistani general
 Iftikhar Malik, Pakistani cricketer 
 Iftikhar Ali Khan Pataudi, Indian cricket captain
 Iftikhar Thakur, Pakistani comedian & actor
 Iftikhar Hussain Shah, Pakistani politician
 Iftikhar Muhammad Chaudhry, Pakistani judge
 Iftekhar, a famous character actor in Indian films.
 Iftikhar Zaman, a DFO in Wildlife in Abottabad, Pakistan.

Pakistani masculine given names